Wallice Hana Watanabe, known mononymously as Wallice, is an American singer-songwriter. She is based in Los Angeles, which is where she was born and raised.

Early life 
Wallice was born and raised in the Los Angeles area. She attended The New School in New York City, majoring in jazz performance and voice before dropping out to pursue music as a full-time career, which she references in her song "23". She and her producer Marinelli had been friends before he became her producer.

Career 
Wallice released her first song "Nyc" in 2017, and released her second song on January 17, 2018; both songs have since been unlisted from all streaming platforms; however they are still available on YouTube. She signed with Dirty Hit in 2021. Wallice opened for Chloe Moriondo in 2021, and played at the Moroccan Longue in Los Angeles on December 7, 2021. Watanabe recently played in the All Things Go Festival on October 1, 2022.

Discography

EPs
 Off the Rails''' (2021)
 90s American Superstar'' (2022)

Singles
 "Punching Bag" (2020)
 "Hey Michael" (2021)
 "Off the Rails" (2021)
 "Wisdom Tooth" (2021)
 "Little League" (2022)
 "Funeral" (2022)
 "90s American Superstar" (2022)

Personal life 
Wallice cites Weezer and MGMT as her two biggest influences.

References

Living people
Singer-songwriters from California
Musicians from California
Musicians from Los Angeles County, California
Indie pop musicians
Bedroom pop musicians
American women musicians
American women singer-songwriters
American people of Japanese descent
American women musicians of Japanese descent
American women pop singers
American indie rock musicians
American indie pop musicians
Dirty Hit artists
1998 births